Aloysio Nunes Ferreira Filho (born 5 April 1945) is a Brazilian lawyer and politician. A member of PSDB, Nunes was a senator from São Paulo from 2011 to 2017, and was Brazil's Minister of Foreign Affairs from 2017 to 2018.

Biography
Aloysio Nunes attended the University of São Paulo Law School in the 1960s when he got involved into politics, associated with the Brazilian Communist Party. During the military dictatorship he participated in protest robberies and mugging. Later he was exiled in Paris, France.

In 1979 he was able to return to Brazilian soil due to the Amnesty Law, that pardoned the oppositionist political militants. He de-affiliated from the Brazilian Communist Party and joined the Brazilian Democratic Movement Party. In 1982 he was elected deputy in São Paulo. The dictatorship ended in 1985.

Political career

In 1990 he was elected vice governor of São Paulo. He governed the state in a few occasions, when the governor was travelling or in each case, absent.

He was candidate for mayor of the city of São Paulo in 1992, but lost to Paulo Maluf.

He was elected federal deputy in 1994. In 1997 he left the party and joined the Brazilian Social Democracy Party. He was a special aide to president Fernando Henrique Cardoso and later his minister of justice.

He worked in the governments of José Serra in the city and the state of São Paulo.

In 2010 he was elected the senator with the highest number of votes in the history of Brazil, with astonishing 11.189.168 votes (30.4%).

He was the candidate to the vice presidency in the 2014 presidential elections in Aécio Neves's ticket. Together they had obtained slightly more than 51 million votes, however they lost the elections by a slight margin to Dilma Rousseff, from the Workers' Party (Partido dos Trabalhadores - PT).

See also
List of foreign ministers in 2017
List of current foreign ministers

References

 Biography of Aloysio Nunes
 Aloysio Nunes official website
 Senate profile of Aloysio Nunes

|-

|-

|-

1945 births
20th-century Brazilian lawyers
Brazilian Social Democracy Party politicians
Brazilian Democratic Movement politicians
Brazilian Communist Party politicians
Foreign ministers of Brazil
Living people
Members of the Federal Senate (Brazil)
Members of the Legislative Assembly of São Paulo
University of São Paulo alumni
Vice Governors of São Paulo (state)
20th-century Brazilian politicians
21st-century Brazilian politicians
Candidates for Vice President of Brazil